ASF Insignia is an ITES Special Economic Zone (SEZ) situated in the Gurgaon, India. The zone consists three mega IT/ITES office buildings named Kings Canyon, Grand Canyon and Black Canyon, approximately 3.5 million sq ft space.

History

Geography

References

Special Economic Zones of India
Economy of Gurgaon